Samuel Vedanayagam Pillai (1826–1889), also known as Mayavaram Vedanayagam Pillai, was an Indian civil servant . Tamil poet, novelist and social worker who is remembered for the authorship of Prathapa Mudaliar Charithram, recognized as the "first modern Tamil novel". Vedanayagam's ideals of women's liberation and education are reflected in the novel. He has a well-known great-grandson, Vijay Antony, who is an actor in the Tamil film industry.

Early life 
Vedanayagam Pillai was born in Inam Kulathur near by Tiruchirappalli on 11 October 1826 to Savarimuthu Pillai and Arockia Mariammal. His father was his first tutor and later he learned Tamil and English under a tutor named Thayagaraja Pillai. On completing his education, Vedanayagam joined the judicial court of Trichinopoly as record keeper and soon was elevated as a translator. He learnt Sanskrit, French and Latin during his tenure and then cleared his law exams.

Literary works 
He became the District Munsiff of Mayuram (presently Mayiladuthurai) and served there for 13 years. Vedanayagam showed a passion for writing from early age. He translated law books to Tamil and his ethical book called Neethi Nool was well accepted. In total he wrote 16 books of which Prathapa Mudaliar Charithram is regarded as the first Tamil Novel. The novel reflects Vedanaygam's own ideals of women's liberation and education.

Carnatic music 
Vedanayagam's contribution to carnatic music is immense. His songs are still a popular choice among singers in concerts. One can find a profusion of Sanskrit words in his Tamil compositions. On the lines of Tyagaraja's "Nidhichala Sukhama" he wrote "Manam Peridha, Varumanam Peridha?" Some of the popular songs of Pillai are ``Naale Nalla Nall," ``Nee Malaikkade Nenje," ``Tharunam, tharunam... 
People like Manonmaniam Sundaram Pillai and Ramalinga Swamigal were admirers of his works.

One of his compositions Nayagar Pakshamadi, (a Ragamaliga - Saama / Shanmugapriya / Kedara Gowla) was included for a dance scene in the 1955 Tamil film Doctor Savithri.

See also

References

External links
 Nayagar Pakshamadi

1826 births
1889 deaths
People from Tiruchirappalli district